Steven Montague Trenchard (born 12 August 1983) is a South African-born Zimbabwean cricketer. He has played first-class cricket for Matabeleland Tuskers and Mid West Rhinos. He made his first-class cricket debut for Matabeleland Tuskers in 2010–11 season.

He previously played club cricket for Wimbledon in the Surrey Championship Premier Division before joining the Matabeleland Tuskers franchise in the 2010–11 season.

References

External links 
 

1983 births
Living people
Zimbabwean cricketers
Matabeleland Tuskers cricketers
Mid West Rhinos cricketers
Southern Rocks cricketers
Cricketers from Johannesburg
Zimbabwean people of South African descent